Unholy Wars: Afghanistan, America and International Terrorism is a book by John K. Cooley, a news correspondent. The book presents Cooley's account of United States policies and alliances from 1979 to 1989 in the Middle East, the flaws and the lacunae inherent in US handling of the affairs, and their contribution into the emergence of a form of terrorism which continues to affect several regions of the World.

Cooley has spent decades in the Middle East and the book is the result of his studies of the subject matter, and his interaction with a number of administrators, diplomats, politicians and the common people.

According to historian Odd Arne Westad the book is unreliable. Based on information by Soviet defector Vasili Mitrokhin, parts of the book "obviously originate in Soviet disinformation from the 1980s".

Chapters
Unholy Wars is divided into eleven chapters noted below:

Carter and Brezhnev in the Valley of Decision
Anwar al-Sadat
Zia al-Haq
Deng Xiaoping
Recruiters, Trainers, Trainees and Assorted Spooks
Donors, Bankers and Profiteers
Poppy Fields, Killing Fields and Drug lords
Russia: Bitter Aftertaste and Reluctant Return
The Contagion Spreads: Egypt and the Maghreb
The Contagion Spreads: The Assault on America

See also 
 Secret Affairs: Britain's Collusion with Radical Islam
 The Grand Chessboard

References

Books about terrorism
Pluto Press books
1999 non-fiction books